Holy Children Chapel of Vanadzor is located at Tsitsernak Children's Camp of the Diocese of Gougark south to Vanadzor, Armenia.

Gallery

See also
Diocese of Gougark

Armenian Apostolic churches in Armenia
Buildings and structures in Vanadzor
Churches completed in 2006